Ajet Toska (born 11 February 1961) is a retired Albanian hammer thrower.
He won the silver medal at the 1987 Mediterranean Games. He also competed at the 1991 World Championships without reaching the final.

His personal best time was 75.92 metres, achieved in August 1986 in Tirana.

References

1961 births
Living people
Albanian male athletes
Albanian hammer throwers
World Athletics Championships athletes for Albania
Mediterranean Games silver medalists for Albania
Athletes (track and field) at the 1987 Mediterranean Games
Mediterranean Games medalists in athletics
Place of birth missing (living people)